Amvrosy (Amvrosiy or Amvrosii) Maksymiliyanovych Buchma (14 March 1891 – 6 January 1957) was a Ukrainian and Soviet stage and film actor, director and pedagogue. He stepped onto the stage professionally for the first time in 1905 with the Ruska Besida Theatre.

He was awarded with the People's Artist of the USSR in 1944.

Life and career
Buchma, was born into the family of a railway worker. He graduated from the Lysenko Institute in 1905, and worked as an extra in the Russkaia Beseda theater in Lvov until 1912. After serving in the Austro-Hungarian army in World War I, he returned to the stage and appeared in leading roles in Kharkov and, since 1936, at the Ivan Franko Theater in Kyiv where he also worked as a director.
Buchma made his film debut in 1924 in two satirical comedies by Les Kurbas: Vendetta, critical of the Church, and Macdonald, 
a about the British politician and his anti-Soviet activities (Buchma played the title role). The actor gained exposure with two films by Pyotr Chardynin: the biopic Taras Shevchenko (1926) in which he portrayed the Ukrainian poet, and the historical drama Taras Triasilo (1927). In 1929, Buchma had one of his most acclaimed roles as the German soldier going insane during a World War I gas attack in Aleksandr Dovzhenko’s Arsenal. The actor played the title role of Gordei Iaroshchuk in The Night Coachman (1928) directed by Georgi Tasin, which tells the story of an ordinary man who awakens politically and sacrifices his life to avenge for the murder of his daughter.
Buchma, transitioned to sound film without great difficulty. Another performance by Buchma is the role of Taras, a man who refuses to give in to the Nazi occupants, in Mark Donskoy’s holocaust tragedy The Undefeated (1945). Buchma also starred in Sergei Eizenshtein’s Ivan the Terrible (1943–1945) in the role of Aleksei Basmanov.

As director, Buchma helmed the silent Behind the Wall (1929), and a sound film in 1954, Earth (co-directed with A. 
Zhvachko).

Buchma, a member of the Communist Party since 1942, was director of the Dovzhenko Film Studios from 1945 to 1948. Beginning in 1940, he taught at the Karpenko-Karii Theater Institute in Kyiv. Buchma received Stalin Prizes for his theater work in 1941 and 1949 and was named People’s Artist of the USSR in 1944.

Filmography

References

External links
 
 
 

1891 births
1957 deaths
20th-century Ukrainian male actors
Actors from Lviv
People from the Kingdom of Galicia and Lodomeria
Communist Party of the Soviet Union members
Kyiv National I. K. Karpenko-Kary Theatre, Cinema and Television University alumni
People's Artists of the USSR
Stalin Prize winners
Recipients of the Order of Lenin
Recipients of the Order of the Red Banner of Labour
Recipients of the title of People's Artists of Ukraine
Austro-Hungarian prisoners of war in World War I
Ukrainian Austro-Hungarians
Ukrainian film directors
Ukrainian male film actors
Ukrainian male silent film actors
Ukrainian male stage actors
Ukrainian Discourse Theatre
Soviet film directors
Soviet male film actors
Soviet male silent film actors

Soviet male stage actors
World War I prisoners of war held by Russia
Burials at Baikove Cemetery